Katapadi is a village near Udupi in Karnataka, India. It is situated at the junction of National Highway 66 and the roads leading to Mattu and Shankarapura. Katapadi is surrounded by lush green fields, rivers and a beautiful beach. Katapadi is well known for Mattu Gulla (a type of eggplant), Kambala and jasmine (mallige in Tulu). The name Katapadi is derived from "Kattu paadi" which means "tie it down" in Tulu. Apparently the place is named Katapadi after a lost horse which was found and tied down here.

Transportation
National Highway NH-66 passes through Katapadi. Udupi is 7 km from Katapadi.

Nearby places 
Udupi, Well known temple city of Southern India. Also known for its Udupi cuisine and restaurants. 
Pajaka Kshetra, Madhwaacharya's birthplace is about 5 kilometers from Katapadi.
Kaup, known for its lighthouse and beach.
Mattu, known for its beach,
Manipal, a university town.

External links
Katapady
Katapady Rotary Club 
Facebook Katapady Community 
 Facebook SVS Community

Villages in Udupi district